Timothy John Winton (born 4 August 1960) is an Australian writer. He has written novels, children's books, non-fiction books, and short stories. In 1997, he was named a Living Treasure by the National Trust of Australia, and has won the Miles Franklin Award four times.

Life and career
Timothy John Winton was born on 4 August 1960 in Subiaco, an inner western suburb of Perth, Western Australia. He grew up in the northern Perth suburb of Karrinyup, before he moved with his family to the regional city of Albany at the age of 12.

Whilst at the Western Australian Institute of Technology, Winton wrote his first novel, An Open Swimmer, which won The Australian/Vogel Literary Award in 1981, launching his writing career.  He has stated that he wrote "the best part of three books while at university". His second book, Shallows, won the Miles Franklin Award in 1984. Winton published Cloudstreet in 1991, which properly established his writing career. He has continued to publish fiction, plays and non-fiction material.

Personal life 
Winton has lived in Italy, France, Ireland and Greece, but currently lives in Western Australia. He met his wife Denise when they were children at school. When he was 18 and recovering from a car accident, they reconnected as she was a student nurse. They married when Winton was 21 and she was 20, and had three children together. They live on the coast north of Perth.

Winton’s younger brother, Andrew Winton, is a musician and a high school chaplain. His younger sister is Sharyn O'Neill, who in 2018 became the Public Sector Commissioner of Western Australia, after 12 years as Director General of the WA Education Department.

As his fame has grown, Winton has guarded his and his family's privacy. He rarely speaks in public yet he is known as "an affable, plain-speaking man of unaffected intelligence and deep emotions."

Reception and honours
In 1995, Winton's The Riders was shortlisted for the Booker Prize for Fiction, as was his 2002 book, Dirt Music. The former is currently being adapted for film, while Dirt Music (film) was released in 2019. He has won many other prizes, including the Miles Franklin Award a record four times: for Shallows (1984), Cloudstreet (1992), Dirt Music (2002) and Breath (2009). Cloudstreet regularly appears in lists of Australia's best-loved novels.

All his books are still in print and have been published in eighteen different languages. His work has also been successfully adapted for stage, screen and radio. On the publication of his novel, Dirt Music, he collaborated with broadcaster Lucky Oceans to produce a compilation CD, Dirt Music – Music for a Novel.

The Tim Winton Young Writers Award, sponsored annually since 1993 by the City of Subiaco, recognizes young writers in the Perth metropolitan area. It is open to short story writers of primary school and secondary school age. Three compilations have been published: Destination Unknown (2001) Life Bytes (2002), and Hatched: Celebrating Twenty Years of the Tim Winton Award for Young Writers (2013). The latter features the winning story from each year of the award from 1993 to 2012. Winton is the patron of the competition.

Winton has been named a Living Treasure by the National Trust and awarded the Centenary Medal for service to literature and the community. He is patron of the Tim Winton Award for Young Writers sponsored by the City of Subiaco, Western Australia. Curtin University has named a lecture theatre in his honour.

Style and themes
Winton draws his prime inspiration from landscape and place, mostly coastal Western Australia. He has said "The place comes first. If the place isn't interesting to me then I can't feel it. I can't feel any people in it. I can't feel what the people are on about or likely to get up to."

Dr Jules Smith for the British Council wrote about Winton, 
"His books are boisterous and lyrical by turns, warm-hearted in their depictions of family life but with characters that often have to be in extremis in order to find themselves. They have a wonderful feeling for the strange beauty of Australia; are frequently flavoured with Aussie vernacular expressions, and a good deal of emotional directness. They question macho role models (his books are full of strong women and troubled men) and are prepared to risk their realist credibility with enigmatic, even visionary endings."

Winton revisits place and, occasionally, characters from one book to another. Queenie Cookson, for example, is a character in Breath who also appears in Shallows, Minimum of Two and in two of the Lockie Leonard books.

Environmental advocacy
Winton is actively involved in the Australian environmental movement. He is a patron of the Australian Marine Conservation Society (AMCS) and is involved in many of their campaigns, notably their work in raising awareness about sustainable seafood consumption. He is a patron of the Stop the Toad Foundation and contributed to the whaling debate with an article on the Last Whale website. He is also a prominent advocate of the Save Moreton Bay organisation, the Environment Defender's Office, the Australian Wildlife Conservancy and the Marine Conservation Society, with which he is campaigning against shark finning.

In 2003, Winton was awarded the inaugural Australian Society of Authors (ASA) Medal in recognition for his work in the campaign to save the Ningaloo Reef.

Winton keeps away from the public eye, unless promoting a new book or supporting an environmental issue. He told reviewer Jason Steger "Occasionally they wheel me out for green advocacy stuff but that's the only kind of stuff I put my head up for."

In 2016, species of fish from the Kimberley region was named after him.

In March 2017 Winton was named patron of the newly established Native Australian Animals Trust. He has always featured the environment and the Australian landscape in his writings. The trust was established to help research and teaching about native animals and their environment.  Associate Professor Tim Dempster, School of Biosciences is quoted as saying, "Australia has a unique and charismatic animal fauna, but our state of knowledge about it is poor. Indeed species can go extinct before we even know of their existence. We have much to learn from our fauna, and a pressing need to do so."

Bibliography

Novels
 An Open Swimmer (1982) 
 Shallows (1984)
 That Eye, The Sky (1986)
 In the Winter Dark (1988)
 Lockie Leonard (1990-1997)
 Cloudstreet (1991)
 The Riders (1994)
 Blueback (1997)
 Dirt Music (2001)
 Breath (2008)
 Eyrie (2013)
 The Shepherd's Hut (2018)

Short fiction 
Collections
 Scission (1985)
 A Blow, A Kiss (1985)
 Minimum Of Two (1987)
 The Collected Shorter Novels of Tim Winton (1995)
 The Turning (2004)
Stories

Plays
 Rising Water (2011)
 Signs of Life (2012)
 Shrine (2013)

Children's books
 Jesse (1988)
 Lockie Leonard, Human Torpedo (1990)
 The Bugalugs Bum Thief (1991)
 Lockie Leonard, Scumbuster (1993)
 Lockie Leonard, Legend (1997)
 The Deep (1998) – picture book illustrated by Karen Louise

Non-fiction
 Land's Edge (1993) – with Trish Ainslie and Roger Garwood
 Local Colour: Travels in the Other Australia (1994), republished in the U.S. as Australian Colors: Images of the Outback (1998) – photography and text by Bill Bachman, additional text by Tim Winton
 Down to Earth: Australian Landscapes (1999) – text by Tim Winton and photographs by Richard Woldendorp
 "How the Reef was Won", The Bulletin, vol. 121 no. 6384, 5 August 2003
 "Landing", A Place on Earth: An Anthology of Nature Writing from Australia and North America, Mark Tredinnick (ed), University of Nebraska Press and University of New South Wales Press, 2003
 Smalltown (2009) – text by Tim Winton and photographs by Martin Mischkulnig
 Island Home (2015)
 Tide-Lands - Idris Murphy (2015) text by Tim Winton and art by Idris Murphy
 The Boy Behind the Curtain (2016 memoir) — also available as 7-CD pack, read by Winton, pub. ABC/Bolinda

Dramatisations
 That Eye The Sky adapted by Justin Monjo and Richard Roxburgh – stage New Theatre, Newtown
 Cloudstreet adapted by Paige Gibbs – ABC radio
 Cloudstreet adapted by Nick Enright and Justin Monjo. First performed by Black Swan Theatre Company. Toured internationally with Belvoir Street Theatre
 Lockie Leonard, Human Torpedo adapted by Paige Gibbs. First performed by the Perth Theatre Company
 Lockie Leonard, Scumbuster adapted by Garry Fry. First performed by Theatre South, Wollongong 1998
 Bugalugs Bum Thief adapted by Spare Parts Puppet Theatre
 Bugalugs Bum Thief adapted by Monkey Baa Theatre Company – live theatre
 The Deep adapted by Spare Parts Puppet Theatre
 Blueback adapted by Peta Murray for Terrapin Puppet Theatre and Spare Parts Puppet Theatre
 The Turning adapted by Bill McCluskey performed by the Perth Theatre Company for the 2008 Perth International Writer's Festival (PIAF)

Adaptations

 A film based on That Eye the Sky, directed by John Ruane, was released in 1994
 A film based on In The Winter Dark directed by James Bogle was released in 1998
 Two television series based on the Lockie Leonard books. The first series screened in 2007, the second in 2010.
 A film adaptation of short story 'The Water Was Dark and Went Forever Down, 2009.
 A TV miniseries based on Cloudstreet was aired in 2011.
 A film based on The Turning was released in September 2013. It was nominated for and won many awards.
 A film adaptation of The Riders was in development but there have been serious problems.
 An opera adaptation of The Riders Victorian Opera/Malthouse Theatre 2014
 An opera adaptation of Cloudstreet State Opera of South Australia. Her Majesty's Theatre, Adelaide, premiered 12 and 13 May 2016.
 A film adaptation of the short story 'Secrets' directed by Michael Rowe is in development.
 A film adaptation of Breath was released in September 2017.
 A film adaptation of Dirt Music, directed by Gregor Jordan, was released in October 2020.
 A film adaptation of Blueback is scheduled for release on 1st January 2023.

Critical studies and reviews of Winton's work
The Fiction of Tim Winton: Earthed and Sacred, Lyn McCredden, Sydney University Press, 2017
Tim Winton: Critical Essays, Lyn McCredden and Nathanael O'Reilly (eds), University of Western Australia Publishing, 2014
 Mind the Country: Tim Winton’s fiction, Salhia Ben-Messahel, University of Western Australia Press, 2006
 Tim Winton: the writer and his work, Michael McGirr, Macmillan Education, 1999
 Tim Winton: a celebration, Hilary McPhee (ed), National Library of Australia, (1999)
 Reading Tim Winton, Richard Rossiter and Lyn Jacobs (eds), Angus & Robertson, (1993)

Awards and nominations
 Four time Miles Franklin Award winner, 1984, 1992, 2002, 2009
 Two time Booker Prize nominee 1995, 2002
 Winton was included in the Bulletin's "100 Most Influential Australians" list in 2006
 Australian National Living Treasure 1997 
 Centenary Medal for service to literature and the community 2001 
 Friends of the National Library of Australia Celebration Award 1999
 Australian Society of Authors Medal for Community work re  'Save Ningaloo Reef' campaign 2003Full list of awards and nominations:An Open Swimmer 1981 Australian Vogel National Literary AwardShallows 1984 Miles Franklin Award,
 1985 Joint Winner Western Australian Premier's Book Award - FictionScission and Other Stories 1985 Western Australian Council Literary Award
 1985 Joint Winner Western Australian Premier's Book Award - FictionMinimum of Two and Other Stories 1988 Winner Western Australian Premier's Book Award - FictionJesse (picture book) 1990 Winner Western Australian Premier's Book Award: Children's BookCloudstreet 1991 NBC Banjo Award for Fiction
 1991 Western Australian Premier's Book Award Fiction
 1992 Miles Franklin Award
 1992 Deo Gloria Award

 Related to Cloudstreet 

 1999 AWGIE Award (for playwrights Nick Enright & Justin Monjo)
 2002 Helpmann Award (Best Direction of a Play : Neil Armfield)
 2002 Helpmann Award (Best Play)Lockie Leonard, Human Torpedo 1991 Joint winner Western Australian Premier's Book Award: Children's Book
 1993 American Library Association Best Book for Young Adults Award 
 1996 Winner YABBA Awards: Fiction for Older Readers Lockie Leonard, Scumbuster 1993 Wilderness Society Environment AwardThe Bugalugs Bum Thief 1994 Winner CROW Award (Children Reading Outstanding Writers): Focus list (Years 3-5)
 1998 Winner YABBA Awards: Fiction for Younger ReadersThe Riders 1995 Booker Prize for Fiction (shortlist)
 1995 Commonwealth Writers Prize (South East Asia and South Pacific Region, Best Book)Blueback 1998 Bolinda Audio Book Awards
 1998 Wilderness Society Environment Award
 1999 WAYRBA Hoffman Award for Young Readers, Lockie Leonard, Legend 1998 Family Award for Children's Literature,Dirt Music 2001 Western Australian Premier's Book Award Premier's Prize -  Book of Year
 2001 Western Australian Premier's Book Award Premier's Prize -  Fiction
 2001 Good Reading Award, 2001 
 2002 Australian Booksellers Association Book of the Year Award
 2002 Man Booker Prize for Fiction (shortlist)
 2002 Miles Franklin Award
 2002 New South Wales Premier's Literary Award, Christina Stead Prize for Fiction
 2002 Kiriyama Pacific Rim Book Prize, Fiction, 2002 – shortlistThe Turning 2004 Colin Roderick Award, 2004 – joint winner
 2005 Queensland Premier's Literary Awards, Best Fiction Book
 2005 New South Wales Premier's Literary Awards, Christina Stead Prize for Fiction
 2005 Inaugural Frank O'Connor International Short Story Award – shortlisted
 2005 Commonwealth Writers Prize, South East Asia and South Pacific Region, Best Book – commended, Breath 
 2008 Age Book of the Year, Fiction – winner
 2008 Indie Awards – Fiction
 2009 Miles Franklin Award
 2009 Shortlisted Commonwealth Writers' Prize, South East Asia and the South Pacific Region
 2009 Shortlisted New South Wales Premier's Literary Awards, Christina Stead PrizeEyrie 2014 shortlisted Queensland Literary Awards – Fiction Book Award 
 2014 shortlisted Voss Literary Prize 
 2014 winner Western Australian Premier's Book Awards – People's Choice Award 
 2014 shortlisted Western Australian Premier's Book Awards – Fiction 
 2014 shortlisted Australian Book Industry Awards (ABIA) – Australian Literary Fiction Book of the Year 
 2014 shortlisted Miles Franklin Literary Award 
 2014 shortlisted Indie Awards – Fiction 
 2014 shortlisted Victorian Premier's Literary Awards – Fiction Island Home : A Landscape Memoir 2015 highly commended The Fellowship of Australian Writers Victoria Inc. National Literary Awards – FAW Excellence in Non-fiction Award I 
 2015 shortlisted Colin Roderick Award
 2016 shortlisted New South Wales Premier's Literary Awards —Douglas Stewart Prize for Non-Fiction
 2016 winner Australian Book Industry Awards (ABIA) – Australian General Non-Fiction Book of the Year
 2016 shortlisted Prime Minister's Literary Awards – Non-Fiction
 2016 shortlisted Queensland Literary Awards – Non-Fiction Book AwardThe Boy Behind the Curtain 2017 longlisted Indie Awards – NonfictionThe Shepherd's Hut'''''
 2019 winner Voss Literary Prize
2019 shortlisted NSW Premier's Literary Awards, Christina Stead Prize for Fiction

References

External links 

 

1960 births
20th-century Australian male writers
20th-century Australian non-fiction writers
20th-century Australian novelists
20th-century Australian short story writers
20th-century essayists
21st-century Australian dramatists and playwrights
21st-century Australian male writers
21st-century Australian non-fiction writers
21st-century Australian novelists
21st-century Australian short story writers
21st-century essayists
APRA Award winners
Australian activists
Australian autobiographers
Australian children's writers
Australian environmentalists
Australian essayists
Australian male dramatists and playwrights
Australian male non-fiction writers
Australian male novelists
Australian male short story writers
Australian social commentators
Australian thriller writers
Australian writers of young adult literature
Environmental fiction writers
Environmental writers
Fabulists
Granta people
Green thinkers
Living people
Magic realism writers
Miles Franklin Award winners
People from Fremantle
Australian psychological fiction writers
Sustainability advocates
Writers about activism and social change
Writers from Perth, Western Australia
Writers of historical fiction set in the modern age